Red House Farm Pit is a  geological Site of Special Scientific Interest east of Wickham Market in Suffolk. It is a Geological Conservation Review site, and in the Suffolk Coast and Heaths Area of Outstanding Natural Beauty.

This pit exposes a  section of the sandwave facies of the Pliocene Coralline Crag Formation. It has many bryozoan fossils.

There is access to the site by a track from Lambert's Lane.

References

Sites of Special Scientific Interest in Suffolk
Geological Conservation Review sites